Ahaziah ("Yah has grasped"; also , Ochozias in the Septuagint and the Douai-Rheims translation) was the eighth king of the northern Kingdom of Israel and the son of Ahab and Jezebel. Like his father, he reigned from Samaria. William F. Albright has dated his reign to 850-849 BC, while E. R. Thiele offers the dates 853-852 BC.

The author of the Books of Kings criticized him for following the ways of his father Ahab and his mother Jezebel, and for making Israel sin "in the way of Jeroboam the son of Nebat". Biblical commentator Albert Barnes notes that the phrase "in the way of his mother" does not occur anywhere else in the Hebrew Bible, and demonstrates the strong feeling of the writer of the Books of Kings as to the influence of Jezebel.

Reign

During his reign the Moabites revolted against his authority. This event is recorded on the Mesha stele, an extensive inscription written in the Moabite language.

Ahaziah formed a business partnership with Jehoshaphat, king of Judah, in order to construct a fleet of trading ships. However, because Jehoshapat had made an alliance with Ahaziah (who was doing the same evil as Ahab and Jezebel, his father and mother, in the kingdom of Israel) the ships were wrecked and never set sail.

His messengers, sent to consult Baal-Zebub (the god of prophecy in Ekron) regarding his recovery from the effects of a fall from the roof-gallery of his palace, were met on the way by Elijah, who sent them back to tell the king that, for his deeds and for seeking a god that was not the God of Israel, he would never rise from his bed. According to the Second Book of Kings, he did not recover from his injuries and died.

Having no son, Ahaziah was succeeded as king of Israel by Joram, his younger brother.

Ancestors
These are ancestors of Ahaziah according to the Bible.

References

External links

9th-century BC Kings of Israel
Accidental deaths from falls
Omrides
Children of Ahab